A Flock of Seagulls are an English new wave band formed in Liverpool in 1979. The group, whose best-known line-up comprised Mike Score, Ali Score, Frank Maudsley and Paul Reynolds, hit the peak of their chart success in the early 1980s.

The group had a string of international hit singles including "I Ran (So Far Away)" (1982), "Space Age Love Song" (1982), "Wishing (If I Had a Photograph of You)" (1982), and "The More You Live, the More You Love" (1984). Their video for "I Ran (So Far Away)" received airplay on MTV during the Second British Invasion. The band won a Grammy Award in 1983 for their instrumental "D.N.A." (1982).

In 2018, the members of the original lineup came together to record an album with the Prague Philharmonic Orchestra entitled Ascension. In 2021, the original lineup once again reunited temporarily to record another album with the Prague Philharmonic Orchestra entitled String Theory.

History

1979–1986: Formation and mainstream success
A Flock of Seagulls were started by Mike Score in late 1979 in Liverpool. According to Mike Score, the band's name was taken from the song "Toiler on the Sea" by punk rock band the Stranglers  and the book Jonathan Livingston Seagull. The original line-up of the band featured Mike on lead vocals and keyboards, Ali Score on drums, and Frank Maudsley on bass. Guitarist Willie Woo was added, while Mark Edmondson replaced Ali on drums when the Score brothers fell out. Soon afterwards, Edmondson departed to make way for a returning Ali, while teenager Paul Reynolds, a close friend of Edmondson, replaced Woo at the behest of Maudsley, thus creating the band's classic line-up. The band practised above Mike Score's hair salon, and then started playing clubs, eventually signing a recording contract.

They recorded sessions for John Peel's show on BBC Radio 1 in May 1981. Eventually, under the management of Harry Maguire, Tommy Crossan, and Mick Rossi, all directors of Checkmount Limited, they began to release singles through Jive Records. The group released their debut single "(It's Not Me) Talking", on Bill Nelson's Cocteau label. They were then signed to major label Jive, distributed through CBS records, where they released their second single "Telecommunication". The single was also produced by Nelson and became a club hit. Their third release was the EP "Modern Love is Automatic". Originally released as a 4 track EP on both 7" and 12", the 12" edition was soon reissued, adding "Telecommunication". This 5 track EP was also their first release in the U.S. In 1982, the group's fourth single "I Ran (So Far Away)", produced by Mike Howlett, the former bass player of the band Gong, became a worldwide hit, reaching number 1 in Australia and the Top 10 in both the US and New Zealand. Their debut album and single "Space Age Love Song" were both successful. The track "D.N.A." won a Grammy Award in 1983 for Best Rock Instrumental Performance. In late 1982, the band finally found major success in their home country with "Wishing (If I Had a Photograph of You)", the first single from their next album Listen, which reached the Top 10. Later, the band was praised for having broken the ground for other musical acts during the advent of the video music area, but as it turned out, 1982 was the peak year of their commercial and critical success.

On Memorial Day Weekend, Saturday, 28 May 1983, A Flock of Seagulls performed at the US Festival along with Oingo Boingo, Men at Work, and others. Three more singles were released from Listen in 1983, including a re-recorded version of their debut single "(It's Not Me) Talking", but they were only minor successes in the UK and abroad. Faced with disappointment, the group changed direction from their science fiction themes and produced a more conceptual emotion-based third album in 1984 called The Story of a Young Heart, with "The More You Live, the More You Love" as the lead single. Despite heavy rotation on MTV and other music video shows at that time, the single was only moderately successful, and the album's other two singles – "Never Again (The Dancer)" and "Remember David" (released only in a few European countries) – did not make any headway. Faced with sliding sales and a loss of direction, the band continued to consider their options whilst touring. During this period, Paul Reynolds left the band, and was replaced by Gary Steadman (from Classix Nouveaux). Keyboardist Chris Chryssaphis was added at the same time to augment their sound. Both stayed in the band for the recording and release of next the album–Dream Come True–but departed once the tour had ended. The album was released in 1986 and failed to chart, thus leading to the dissolving of the band until 1988.

1988–present: Reformation and the current era
In 1988 the band performed in Philadelphia with Mike Score accompanied by local musicians Ed Berner and Dave Maerz on guitar, bass guitarist Mike Radcliffe, keyboardist Mike Railton, and drummers Kaya Pryor and Jonte Wilkins. This lineup expanded the following year to include drummer Mike Marquart; but was then reduced to a five-piece band consisting of Score, Berner, Pryor, Radcliffe, and Railton; it was this lineup which released the single "Magic" that same year.

In 1994, the band's lineup changed again; this time to a formation consisting of Score, Berner, and new recruits A.J. Mazzetti (drums) and Dean Pichette (bass guitar). They recorded the album The Light at the End of the World in 1994, but it failed to chart. Drummer John Walker later replaced Mazzetti.

In 1998, Berner, Walker, and Pichette departed the band and were replaced by Joe Rodriguez, Darryl Sons, and Rob Wright, respectively. In 1999, the band re-recorded the Madonna song "This Used to Be My Playground" for the 2000 Madonna tribute album The World's Greatest 80s Tribute to Madonna. In November 2003, the original lineup of Mike and Ali Score, Paul Reynolds and Frank Maudsley reunited for a one-off performance on the VH1 series Bands Reunited. In September 2004, they reformed again and did a brief tour in the United States. Though the tour continued to be advertised as the "original lineup", later shows no longer included the original band, but was Mike Score's continuation of the newer band; which by this point consisted of Score, Rodriguez, and new recruits Michael Brahm (drums), and Pando (bass guitar). In 2005, this version of the group starred in the American version of the entertainment show Hit Me Baby, One More Time, where they performed "I Ran" and a cover of Ryan Cabrera's song, "On The Way Down" for a chance to have $20,000 donated to a charity of their choice.

In June 2011, Frank Maudsley and Paul Reynolds performed at Croxteth Park music festival in Liverpool under the name A Flock of Seagulls.

On 4 February 2013, Mike Score indicated via his YouTube account that he was pursuing his solo career. He released the singles "All I Wanna Do" in February 2013, and "Somebody Like You" in January 2014. In late July 2013, after a Southern California performance, Mike Score told the Los Angeles Daily News that the band's rented van that contained $70,000 of equipment and the hard drives that stored tracks for his solo album Zeebratta were stolen from a Comfort Inn. While this delayed the album's release, he was able to reconstruct it with music files from his home in Florida. Zeebratta was finally released on 1 March 2014.

Kevin Rankin replaced Brahm on drums in 2016, and Gordon Deppe—from the Canadian band Spoons—replaced Joe Rodriguez in December 2017.

On 3 May 2018, it was announced that the band's original four members were reuniting to record a new album titled Ascension, their first studio recording since 1984. Featuring the Prague Philharmonic Orchestra, it would be a 12-track album composed of new renditions of their previous hits alongside one new song. The video for "Space Age Love Song" premiered on YouTube on 6 June, and an EP featuring five versions of the song was released digitally two days later. The album was available in physical form in late June 2018, then released digitally and in stores on 6 July. In December 2018, the orchestral version of "I Ran" was released as a single.

On 10 May 2021 the band announced through their social networks that they would release a new orchestral album, again together with the Prague Philharmonic Orchestra, which would be called String Theory. This album features other of the band's biggest hits, such as "Messages", "Remember David" and "Say You Love Me", the latter being the lead single. The album was released on 20 August 2021.

Legacy
Owing to their memorable and unusual style and appearance, A Flock of Seagulls are sometimes referred to with ironic appreciation. The New Musical Express wrote: "Of course, everyone remembers this group now for singer Mike Score's ridiculous back-combed haircut and the fact that they are mentioned in Pulp Fiction. So now they're kind of cool, but in the early 1980s it was a different story." 

The band was featured on Viacom's VH1 and Sony's BMG Legacy Recordings' 2006 revival CD series and multi-platform marketing campaign, "We Are the 80's". In a 2007 article for The Guardian, Alfred Hickling described the group as "dreadful", and unfavourably compared them to new wave peers OMD and other Liverpool acts of the time.

Their dramatic style has drawn much criticism and parody, but the band have also been recognized as a pioneering act, capturing the spirit of their time, particularly with the guitar work of Paul Reynolds and sonically multi-layered hits such as "Space Age Love Song", "Telecommunication", and "Modern Love Is Automatic". The band is also noted for creating a successful concept album, their debut, which alludes to an alien invasion of earth. Billboard writer Robert Christgau applauded their "mechanical lyrics, about a mechanical end of the world," while noting the "aural pleasure" of both the band's debut album and the follow-up. 

In addition, the band has given rise to various contemporaries such as Depeche Mode, The Fixx, Erasure and Yazoo, and established the template for much of what defines today's contemporary pop, dance music and electronica.

The video for "I Ran" was low budget (even for the time), but enjoyed enormous success, and is well-remembered in part because MTV played it frequently.

Personnel

Current members
Mike Score – vocals, guitars, keyboards (1979–1986, 1988–present)
Pando – bass (2004–present)
Kevin Rankin – drums (2016–present)
Gord Deppe – guitars (2017–present)

Former members
Frank Maudsley – bass (1979–1986, 2003, 2004, 2018, 2021)
Ali Score – drums (1979–1986, 2003, 2004, 2018, 2021)
Paul Reynolds – guitars (1980–1984, 2003, 2004, 2018, 2021)
Willie Woo – guitars (1980)
Mark Edmondson – drums (1980)
Chris Mars Chryssaphes – keyboards (1984–1985)
Gary Steadman – guitars (1984–1985)
Ed Berner – guitars (1988–1998)
Dave Maerz – guitars (1988–1989)
Kaya Pryor – drums, percussion (1988–1994)
Mike Radcliffe – bass (1988–1994)
Mike Railton – keyboards (1988–1994)
Jonte Wilkins – drums (1988–1989)
Mike Marquart – drums (1989)
Shavin Duffy – bass (1990)
A.J. Mazzetti – drums (1994–1998)
Dean Pichette – bass (1994–1998)
Joe Rodriguez – guitars (1998–2017)
Lucio Rubino – bass (1998–2002)
John Walker – drums (1995–1998)
Darryl Sons – drums (1998–2004)
Rob Wright – bass (1998–2004)
Robbie Hanson – bass (1999–2006)
Albert Cruz – drums (2001–2006)
Michael Brahm – drums (2004–2016)

Timeline

Line-ups

Discography

A Flock of Seagulls (1982)
Listen (1983)
The Story of a Young Heart (1984)
Dream Come True (1986)
The Light at the End of the World (1995)
Ascension (2018)
String Theory (2021)

See also
List of bands named after other performers' songs
List of new wave artists
List of Peel sessions
List of synth-pop artists

References

External links

 
1979 establishments in England
1986 disestablishments in England
1989 establishments in England
English new wave musical groups
British synth-pop new wave groups
Musical quartets
Grammy Award winners
Musical groups disestablished in 1986
Musical groups established in 1979
Musical groups from Liverpool
Musical groups reestablished in 1988
English synth-pop groups
English electronic rock musical groups
Second British Invasion artists